The 2018–19 San Jose State Spartans men's basketball team represented San Jose State University in the 2018–19 NCAA Division I men's basketball season. Led by second-year head coach Jean Prioleau, the Spartans played their home games at the Event Center Arena as members of the Mountain West Conference. They finished the season 4–27, 1–17 in Mountain West play to finish in last place. They lost in the first round of the Mountain West tournament to Air Force.

Previous season
The Spartans finished the 2017–18 season 4–26, 1–17 in Mountain West play to finish in last place. They lost in the first round of the Mountain West tournament to Wyoming.

Off-season

Departures

Incoming transfers

2018 recruiting class

Roster

Schedule and results

|-
!colspan=9 style=| Non-conference regular season

|-
!colspan=9 style=| Mountain West regular season

|-
!colspan=9 style=|Mountain West tournament

References

San Jose State Spartans men's basketball seasons
San Jose State